Pakize Gözde Dökel (born August 17, 1997) is a Turkish-German football midfielder currently playing in the German Frauen-Westfalenliga for 1. FFC Recklinghausen. She is a member of the Turkish national team.

Dökel plays as a midfielder for 1. FFC Recklinghausen 2003.

She was admitted to the Turkey national team, and debuted in the friendly match against Estonia on April 7, 2018.

References

Living people
1997 births
German people of Turkish descent
German women's footballers
Women's association football midfielders
Turkey women's international footballers
Turkish women's footballers
Association football midfielders